Pycnarmon pulchralis is a moth in the family Crambidae. It was described by Charles Swinhoe in 1901. It is found in Myanmar.

References

Spilomelinae
Moths described in 1901
Moths of Asia